is a Japanese band. Their album Santa Fe reached the 19th place on the Weekly Oricon Albums Chart and their singles "For You" and "Oh Yeah!!!!!!!" reached the 24th place on the Weekly Oricon Singles Chart. "Oh Yeah!!!!!!!" was also the third ending song for the second season of the Dragon Ball Kai anime television series. Their single "Forever Dreaming" is the fourth ending theme for Dragon Ball Super.

Discography

Albums

Singles

DVDs

Notes

References

External links 

  
  

2010 establishments in Japan
Japanese pop rock music groups
Musical groups established in 2010
Musical groups from Tokyo
Nippon Columbia artists